Chalcidoptera emissalis is a moth in the family Crambidae. It was described by Francis Walker in 1866. It is found in north-eastern India, Sri Lanka, Burma, Singapore, Borneo, Ambon Island, Aru, New Guinea and Australia, where it has been recorded from Queensland.

Adults are sexually dimorphic. Males are dark brown with white patches and females have transparent wings with dark brown veins and squiggly lines.

References

Moths described in 1866
Spilomelinae